Creston Township may refer to the following places in the United States:

 Creston Township, Platte County, Nebraska
 Creston Township, Ashe County, North Carolina

Township name disambiguation pages